Monica Sereda (born July 13, 1967) is an American Paralympic cyclist. She is set to compete at the 2020 Summer Paralympics, which were postponed to 2021.

Personal life
Sereda was born in Chicago, Illinois on July 13, 1967, and graduated from Lyons Township High School in La Grange, Illinois. She retired as a master sergeant in the United States Army in 2011.

References 

1967 births
Living people
American female cyclists
Paralympic cyclists of the United States
Cyclists at the 2020 Summer Paralympics
LGBT cyclists
Cyclists from Chicago
Sportspeople from La Grange, Illinois
Saint Leo University alumni
United States Army non-commissioned officers
Military personnel from Illinois
LGBT military personnel
21st-century American women